Wisarut Imura (born October 18, 1997), simply known as Tia, is a Thai footballer who plays as a defensive midfielder for a Thai League 1 club Bangkok United.

International career
Wisarut has represented various Thailand youth national squads, including appearances at the 2015 AFF U-19 Youth Championship in Laos, the 2016 AFC U-19 Championship in Bahrain, and the 2020 AFC U-23 Championship qualification.

In 2022, he was called up by Thailand national team for friendly match against Nepal and Suriname.

International goals

U19

Honours

International
Thailand U19
 AFF U-19 Youth Championship (1): 2015

References

External links
 
 Wisarut Imura's info at Thai league official website – thaileague.co.th.
 

1997 births
Living people
Wisarut Imura
Association football midfielders
Wisarut Imura
Wisarut Imura
Wisarut Imura
Wisarut Imura
Wisarut Imura
Wisarut Imura
Competitors at the 2019 Southeast Asian Games
Wisarut Imura